is a railway station in the city of Tōno, Iwate, Japan, operated by East Japan Railway Company (JR East).

Lines
Masuzawa Station is served by the Kamaishi Line, and is located 33.6 rail kilometers from the terminus of the line at Hanamaki Station.

Station layout
The station has a single island platform connected to the station building by a level crossing. The platforms are not numbered.  The station is unattended.

Platforms

History
The line was nationalized in 1936, becoming the Kamaishi Line. The station was renamed to its present name on 16 December 1924. The station was absorbed into the JR East network upon the privatization of the Japanese National Railways (JNR) on 1 April 1987.

Surrounding area
 
 
 Sarugaishi River

See also
 List of railway stations in Japan

References

External links

  

Railway stations in Iwate Prefecture
Kamaishi Line
Railway stations in Japan opened in 1915
Tōno, Iwate
Stations of East Japan Railway Company